is one of the eight wards of the city of Hiroshima, Japan.

The Hiroshima Branch of the Japan Mint is located here.

The ward added the former town of Yuki from Saeki District on April 25, 2005.

Wards of Hiroshima